Doug Thomson may refer to:

 Dougie Thomson (born 1951), Scottish musician
 Doug Thomson (footballer) (1896–1959), Australian rules footballer